Molecular Immunology is a peer reviewed academic journal published by Pergamon Press (an imprint of Elsevier). The editor is M.R. Daha.

External links 
 

Immunology journals
Elsevier academic journals